is a hack-and-slash action game developed by Cyclone Systems and published by Taito for the Sega Genesis/Mega Drive in 1991.

Gameplay

There are seven stages for gamers to play through; most of the enemies in each stage are merely a palette swap of each other. Defeating enemies allow Macress to gain access to power-ups that will give him physical enhancement like angel's wings and the strong body of a horse.

Plot

Taking place in a Greek Mythological setting, players control the Greek Titan Macress (unique to this work of fiction) as he travels back in time in order to prevent the demoness Gorgon from taking over the entire world.

Reception

Mean Machines gave it a score of 72%, opining "this Rastan-like game could have done with better graphics and sound, but as it stands, Saint Sword is a fairly playable effort."

References

1991 video games
Fantasy video games
Platform games
Sega Genesis games
Sega Genesis-only games
Single-player video games
Taito games
Video games developed in Japan